The Province of Häme was a province of Finland from 1831 to 1997.

In 1997 the southern parts with Kanta-Häme, Päijät-Häme was merged with the province of Uusimaa and Kymi into the new Province of Southern Finland. The northern part with Pirkanmaa was merged with the provinces of Vaasa, Central Finland, Turku and Pori into the new Province of Western Finland. 

The province corresponds roughly to the current regions of Kanta-Häme, Päijät-Häme and Pirkanmaa.

Maps

Municipalities in 1997 (cities in bold) 

 Asikkala
 Forssa
 Hattula
 Hauho
 Hausjärvi
 Hollola
 Humppila
 Hämeenkoski
 Hämeenkyrö
 Hämeenlinna
 Ikaalinen
 Janakkala
 Jokioinen
 Juupajoki
 Kalvola
 Kangasala
 Kihniö
 Kuhmalahti
 Kuorevesi
 Kuru
 Kylmäkoski
 Kärkölä
 Lahti
 Lammi
 Lempäälä
 Loppi
 Luopioinen
 Längelmäki
 Mouhijärvi
 Mänttä
 Nastola
 Nokia
 Orivesi
 Padasjoki
 Parkano
 Pirkkala
 Pälkäne
 Renko
 Riihimäki
 Ruovesi
 Sahalahti
 Tammela
 Tampere
 Toijala
 Tuulos
 Urjala
 Valkeakoski
 Vesilahti
 Viiala
 Viljakkala
 Vilppula
 Virrat
 Ylöjärvi
 Ypäjä

Former municipalities (disestablished before 1997) 
 Aitolahti
 Akaa (re-established 2007)
 Eräjärvi
 Hämeenlinnan mlk
 Koijärvi
 Messukylä
 Pohjaslahti
 Somerniemi
 Sääksmäki
 Teisko
 Tottijärvi
 Tyrväntö
 Vanaja

Governors 

 Carl Klick 1831
 Johan Fredrik Stichaeus 1831–1841
 J. V. Snellman 1831 (acting)
 Carl Otto Rehbinder 1841–1863
 Samuel Werner von Troil 1863–1865
 Clas Herman Molander 1865–1869
 Hjalmar (Sebastian) Nordenstreng 1870–1875
 Edvard (Reinhold) von Ammondt 1875–1887
 Torsten Costiander 1887–1895
 Edvard Boehm 1895–1899
 Gustaf Axel von Kothen 1900–1901
 Isidor Svertschkoff 1901–1904
 Alexander Pappkoff 1904–1906
 Ivar (Sune) Gordie 1906–1910
 Arthur Brofeldt 1910–1911 (acting)
 Rafael Knut Harald Spåre 1911–1917
 Kustaa Adolf Saarinen 1917–1918 (acting)
 Antti Tulenheimo 1918–1919
 Albert von Hellens 1919–1930
 Sigurd Mattsson 1930–1959
 Jorma Tuominen 1959–1972
 Valdemar Sandelin 1973–1979
 Risto Tainio 1979–1994
 Kaarina Suonio 1994–1997

Provinces of Finland (1917–97)